Poovinnu Puthiya Poonthennal is a 1986 Indian Malayalam-language action thriller film written and directed by Fazil. The film stars Mammootty and Suresh Gopi. It features Sujitha, Nadiya Moidu, Babu Antony, Thilakan, Lalu Alex, Maniyanpilla Raju, Sukumari and Siddique in supporting roles. The film was produced by Swargachitra Appachan under the banner of Swargachitra. It revolves around a drunkard widower who helps a deaf and mute boy find his parent's killers. The film features original songs composed by Kannur Rajan, cinematography was done by Anandakuttan.

The film was released on 12 September 1986 on Onam. Despite being a box office failure, the film received critical acclaim. Poovinnu Puthiya Poonthennal was remade into six other languages — in Tamil as Poovizhi Vasalile, in Telugu as Pasivadi Pranam, in Kannada as Aapadbandhava, in Hindi as Hatya, in Bangladeshi as Khotipuron and in Sinhalese as Veda Barinam Vedak Nehe - becoming the first Malayalam film to be remade into six different languages and only the second Indian film to do so after Anuraga Aralithu. The film also is the first Malayalam film to be remade into a foreign language.

Plot

A deaf and mute boy witnesses his widowed mother being murdered by two men. Later, he escapes from them. Kiran is an alcoholic who is not able to recover from the tragic death of his family. Kiran finds the boy when he finds the boy sleeping in the trash and adopts him, naming him Kittu, after his son. Soon he meets Neetha and become close friends without knowing that she is Kittu's aunt. Kittu recognizes his mother's murderer in a bar along with their boss. The police discovers the body of his mother and Neetha realizes it is her sister's son. Kiran kills the murderers and finally he also faces death.

Cast
Mammootty as Kiran
Suresh Gopi as Suresh
Sujitha as Benny / Kittu
Nadiya Moidu as Neetha
Thilakan as Chandrasekhara Menon, Neetha and Sathi's father
Lalu Alex as Inspector Simon
Babu Antony as Renji
Maniyanpilla Raju as Alex
Sukumari as Doctor (cameo)
Jayalalita as Sathi/Annie, Benny's mother
N. F. Varghese as man disguised as Benny's father
Mini Arun as lady disguised as Benny's mother
Mini Jairaj as the singer young woman in the bar
Siddique as Man at Priest's place
Ajith Kollam as Gunda
John Varghese as priest

Soundtrack
The music was composed by Kannur Rajan with lyrics by Bichu Thirumala.

Reception
The film was a commercial failure. According to producer Swargachitra Appachan, the film was not even able to make the money he had invested in it. Appachan felt that even with positive critical response, the film could not do well due to the fact that, there were six Mammootty films releasing in the same week, out of which only Aavanazhi and Nandi Veendum Varika could achieve success and the film could not get the exposure due to the sheer amount of films released in the Onam week. Another reason for the failure of the film is believed to be because of the climax of the film in which Mammootty finally dies, which was not accepted by the audience. The producer says that in the   Tamil version - Poovizhi Vasalile the protagonist doesn't die and hence, was a commercial success.

Awards
Fazil won the Kerala State Film Award for Best Director for Ennennum Kannettante and Poovinu Puthiya Poonthennal.

Remakes
The movie was remade in six languages, all the climaxes of the films were different. Baby Sujitha and Babu Antony reprised their roles in four of the films. The Telugu version even becoming the highest-grossing Telugu film of all time.

References

External links

1980s Malayalam-language films
1980s crime thriller films
Malayalam films remade in other languages
1986 films
Films directed by Fazil
Indian crime thriller films